My Japan is a 1945 American anti-Japanese propaganda short film produced to spur sale of American war bonds. The film takes the form of a mock travelogue of Japan, presented by an impersonated Japanese narrator.

Background 
The film was produced by the War Finance Division, a division of the United States Office of War Information, which was responsible for promoting the sale of all securities offered to the public by the Treasury Department. The 1945 United States Government Manual outlines their rights and responsibilities, stating:

My Japan was the only film produced by the War Finance Division in 1945.

Content 

The technique used in My Japan is a form of reverse psychology—to make Americans angry with themselves for their materialistic values, and then turn this anger against the enemy:

The film also seeks to anger Americans by belittling their military achievements up to that point:

Statistical comparisons 
The narrator makes many claims about the numbers and quality of the Japanese army in comparison to America's. These can be compared to actual record to determine their integrity. For example:

Propaganda comparisons 
Visuals seen in My Japan can also be witnessed in another source of propaganda from 1945, Know Your Enemy: Japan, directed by Frank Capra. These images, having been claimed to be footage taken by the enemy, are placed in a context which allows for the benefits of buying and holding war bonds to be seen.

These duplicate images include workers of rice fields, school children being taught by "trained government personnel", workers in iron factories, volcanoes, and dead soldiers. Each one of these is placed in different contexts to "prove" two separate points: the effectiveness of the Japanese culture and economy as well as the unknown "threat" that Japan held for Americans. The latter was to be corrected through the purchase of war bonds.

Censorship and the American response 
There is little evidence to document the American response to My Japan or how effective it was in convincing Americans to buy war bonds. My Japan was part of a massive effort to promote the Mighty 7th War Loan, and separating those motivated by the film from those motivated by other sources is impossible. Government censorship further clouds the issue because the press was largely incapable of printing anything but positive reviews about war bonds and the war effort in general. (Guide to Federal Records) (Reporting from the Front Lines).

Newspaper articles of the time were distinctly pro-war and contribute to the overwhelming number of sources encouraging Americans to buy war bonds:

Modern responses to My Japan are often associated with concerns regarding censorship, racism, and arms development, but rarely offer insight into first-hand reactions in 1945.

See also 
Propaganda in the United States
List of Allied Propaganda Films of World War 2

References 

Bartelt, Edward F. "United States Government Manual - 1945 (Treasury Department)." http://www.ibiblio.org. United States Office of War Information. 8 Nov 2006 <http://www.ibiblio.org/hyperwar/USGM/Treasury.html>.
"Battle of Tarawa" u-s-history.com. Oregon Coast. 7 Nov 2006 <http://www.u-s-history.com/pages/h1752.html>.
"Casualties in World War II". World War II Multimedia Database. MFA Productions LLC. 7 Nov 2006 <http://worldwar2database.com/html/frame5.html>.
Chicago Daily Tribune. “Mayor and Aids Take Over Bond Program Today.” Chicago Daily Tribune 28 May 1945.
Clancey, Patrick. "USMC Monograph: The Guadalcanal Campaign". ibiblio. HyperWar Project. 7 Nov 2006 <http://www.ibiblio.org/hyperwar/USMC/Guadalcanal/USMC-M-Guadalcanal-A.html>.
"Guide to Federal Records - Records of the Office of War Information". https://www.archives.gov. 1995. National Archives and Records Administration. 7 Nov 2006 <https://www.archives.gov/research/guide-fed-records/groups/208.html>.
My Japan. Videocassette. United States Office of War Information, 1945.
"My Japan 1945" Information Clearing House. 7 Nov 2006 <http://www.informationclearinghouse.info/article7686.htm>.
"Population". Statistical Handbook of Japan. Statistics Bureau & Statistical Research and Training Institute. 7 Nov 2006 <http://www.stat.go.jp/English/data/handbook/c02cont.htm>.
"Reporting from the Front Lines". U.S. News Classroom. U.S. News & World Report. 7 Nov 2006 <http://www.usnewsclassroom.com/resources/activities/war_reporting/timeline/ww2-censor.html>.
Newcomb, Richard. "The Battle of Iwo Jima". University of San Diego History Department. 1982. University of San Diego. 7 Nov 2006 <https://web.archive.org/web/20090720132646/https://history.sandiego.edu/gen/WW2Timeline/LUTZ/iwo.html>.

External links 

 
 
 

1945 films
American World War II propaganda shorts
United States government films
Articles containing video clips
American black-and-white films
American documentary films
Films set in Japan
1945 documentary films
Japan in non-Japanese culture
1940s English-language films
1940s American films